Xóc đĩa is gambling game, originated and widespread in  Vietnam. The game probably originated around 1909. This game is considered illegal by the governmental authorities because it's thought to be linked with criminal activities and gambling is defined as an illegal act in the Vietnamese Criminal Code.

Playing 

It is played with 4 coin shaped tokens in 4 different colors.

Gambling games